East Riding County Council (ERCC) was the county council of the East Riding of Yorkshire (excluding the county borough of Kingston upon Hull) from 1 April 1889 to 31 March 1974.

Chairmen 
 1889–1890: David Burton (resigned)
 1890–1891: Beilby Lawley, 3rd Baron Wenlock (resigned; first time)
 1891–1901: Sir Charles Legard, 11th Baronet
 1902–1912: Beilby Lawley, 3rd Baron Wenlock (second time)
 1912–1936: Robert de Yarburgh-Bateson, 3rd Baron Deramore
 1936–1968: Sir John Dunnington-Jefferson, 1st Baronet
 1968–1974: Charles Wood, 2nd Earl of Halifax

References

Former county councils of England
History of the East Riding of Yorkshire
1889 establishments in England
1974 disestablishments in England